Yaluwak is a genus of armored catfish native to South America where they are only known from Guyana, containing only a single species Yaluwak primus. It was first described in a 2020 study and placed within the tribe Ancistrini.

Description
Like other Loricariids, Yaluwak primus has plates of armor on its body and a suckermouth. Small odontodes are also present along the body, but are absent from the preopercle and the dorsal two thirds of the opercle.

The genus can be distinguished from the Hypostominae genera Corymbophanes, Hypostomus and Pterygoplichthys and from all non-Hypostominae loricariids by having a cluster of >25 evertible cheek odontodes (vs. cheek odontodes absent or <10); and from all other members of the Hypostominae except some Ancistrus species, Araichthys loro Zawadzki et al., 2016, Chaetostoma carrioni (Norman, 1935) and Leptoancistrus by lacking an adipose fin, having instead a low ridge of azygous plates. Yaluwak can be diagnosed from all Ancistrus species and Chaetostoma carrioni by its having a fully plated snout, from Araichthys loro by having a taller caudal peduncle and longer tooth rows and from Leptoancistrus by lacking cheek odontodes that extend past the cleithrum and having dorsal fin ii,7 (vs. ii,8). Yaluwak is also differentiable from Corymbophanes by its larger maximum body size.

This species is considered a medium-sized loricariid, with the largest specimen examined measuring 122.9 mm Standard Length.

The coloration of the species is light brown mottling on a dark brown base, with a pale white abdomen covered with light brown or grey stippling around the margins and posterior to pectoral girdle. Fins lighter distally than proximally. Pectoral fin with spots on spine and faint or no spots on rays; rays darker than membranes, fin especially dark at base and along spine and first branched ray. Pelvic, dorsal and anal fins with small dark spots on rays and dorsal spine, rays considerably darker than membranes; dorsal fin with black band at distal edge. Caudal fin with dark spots centred on rays, but combining to form bands proximally; number of bands higher in larger specimen. Iris brick red.

Distribution and habitat
The species is only known from the uppermost rapids of Sukwabi Creek, an eastern arm of the Ireng River (Brazil: Rio Maú), just below Wotowanda Falls. Other similar habitat exists below the nearby Andu Falls and Uluk Tuwuk Falls and it seems likely that the species also occurs there, if not also in similar habitats further downstream.

References

Fish of South America
Vertebrates of Guyana
Hypostominae
Catfish genera
Freshwater fish genera
Monotypic fish genera
Monotypic ray-finned fish genera
Monotypic freshwater fish genera
Taxa named by Nathan Keller Lujan
Taxa named by Jonathan W. Armbruster
Taxa named by David C. Werneke
Fish described in 2020
Taxobox binomials not recognized by IUCN